Emamzadeh Abbas or Imamzadeh Abbas may refer to:
 Emamzadeh Abbas, Ilam
 Emamzadeh Abbas, Kermanshah
 Emamzadeh Abbas, Markazi
 Emamzadeh Abbas, Mazandaran
 Imamzadeh Abbas, Sari